Pokei Lake is a lake of Ontario, Canada. It is situated about 15 kilometres southeast of the town of White River.

References

 National Resources Canada
Lakes of Algoma District

See also
List of lakes in Ontario